San Alberto Department is a department of Córdoba Province, Argentina. It is composed by many municipalities and communes. Its main industry is tourism and it is visited by many people each summer.
San Alberto includes cities and towns as Mina Clavero, Villa Cura Brochero and Nono.

Settlements 

 Ámbul
 Arroyo de Los Patos
 Las Calles
 Las Rabonas
 Mina Clavero
 Nono
 Panaholma
 San Lorenzo
 San Pedro
 San Vicente
 Sauce Arriba
 Villa Cura Brochero
 Villa Sarmiento

References

Departments of Córdoba Province, Argentina